David Felgate (born 4 March 1960) is a Welsh former professional footballer who played as a goalkeeper. Due to his stature, many supporters affectionately nicknamed him "the fat goalie". Felgate had a long professional career from 1978 to 1995, making a total of 612 Football League appearances. Of the league appearances, 238 came with Bolton Wanderers and he also turned out for league sides Rochdale, Crewe Alexandra, Lincoln City, Grimsby Town, Cardiff City, Chester City, and Wigan Athletic.

He also had spells with Bury and Wolverhampton Wanderers without making any league appearances for these clubs, and Felgate later continued to play non-league football for clubs including Leigh RMI, Hyde United, and Bacup Borough until he was in his mid-40s.

Felgate is perhaps best known for his performance in net for Leigh RMI against Fulham in the 1998–99 FA Cup at Craven Cottage. Non-league Leigh achieved a 1–1 draw against the southwest London side, and thereby attention of the British media. In particular, Felgate, who was then 38 years old, received widespread plaudits for his performance in the match, which prompted then-Fulham boss Kevin Keegan to declare that Felgate's goalkeeping was "the best I've ever seen at any level."

Felgate won a solitary full Welsh international cap in 1983, having earlier played for his nation's schoolboys team. The keeper came on as a substitution for the legendary Neville Southall in a friendly against Romania. Felgate would have had an additional international cap had Wales's scheduled match against Northern Ireland two years earlier in 1981 not been cancelled to Bobby Sands's hunger strike.

After his retirement from playing, Felgate first acted as Manchester City's Academy Goalkeeping Coach and later became the assistant manager for the semi-professional Rossendale United club. He was then employed by Stockport County's as first team Goalkeeping Coach in League One.

In January 2009 he left Stockport County to rejoin Manchester City as their academy goalkeeping coach.

Honours
Bolton Wanderers
Associate Members' Cup: 1988–89

Leigh RMI
Northern Premier League Premier Division: 1999–2000
Peter Swales Challenge Shield: 1999–2000

References

External links
David Felgate career stats at Soccerbase
Bolton Wanderers Interview
Lincoln City League Legend
Unofficial Dave Felgate Profile at The Forgotten Imp

People from Blaenau Ffestiniog
Sportspeople from Gwynedd
Bolton Wanderers F.C. players
Rochdale A.F.C. players
Crewe Alexandra F.C. players
Lincoln City F.C. players
Cardiff City F.C. players
Grimsby Town F.C. players
Rotherham United F.C. players
Bury F.C. players
Wolverhampton Wanderers F.C. players
Chester City F.C. players
Wigan Athletic F.C. players
Leigh Genesis F.C. players
Hyde United F.C. players
Radcliffe F.C. players
Chorley F.C. players
Bacup Borough F.C. players
Rossendale United F.C. players
Welsh footballers
English Football League players
National League (English football) players
Wales international footballers
Manchester City F.C. non-playing staff
1960 births
Living people
Association football goalkeepers
Association football goalkeeping coaches